District Council 37 (Also known as DC37) is New York City's largest public sector employee union, representing over 150,000 members  and 50,000 retirees. 

DC37 was chartered in 1944 by AFSCME to represent public employees in New York City. It was small and relatively unsuccessful under its first president, Henry Feinstein,  but under the leadership of Jerry Wurf, who took over as president in 1952, the union grew to 25,000 members by 1957, and 36,000 members in 1962. It also successfully pressured Mayor Robert F. Wagner Jr., to pass executive order 49, which recognized collective bargaining rights for public sector workers.

Wurf became president of AFSCME in 1964 and was replaced later that year by Victor Gotbaum, who was Executive Director of DC37 until 1987. Under Gotbaum, the union continued to grow in numbers and power.

People who worked closely with Gotbaum included: Lillian Roberts, Associate Director in charge of Organization; Edwin Maher, Associate Director in charge of employees; Daniel Nelson, head of the Department of Research; Julius Topol, DC37 counsel; Bernard Stephens, editor of the Public Employee Press; and Alan Viani, who took over as head of the Department of Research in 1973 after Nelson's death.

Gotbaum's successor was Stanley Hill, who subsequently resigned in 1998 due to a major scandal in the union. After a trusteeship by AFSCME, Hill was ultimately succeeded in 2002 by Lillian Roberts, who first started working with Gotbaum in 1959. Roberts retired at the end of 2014 and was succeeded by her associate Henry Garrido, who now serves as executive director.

See also 
 Chris Postiglione Triangle, honoring a member of the union

References

External links 
 DC-37
Historic DC 37 photos from the AFSCME Archives. Walter P. Reuther Library of Labor and Urban Affairs. Wayne State University.
American Federation of State, County, and Municipal Employees (AFSCME), District Council 37 Records (WAG 265) at the Tamiment Library and Robert F. Wagner Archives.

Organizations based in New York City
American Federation of State, County and Municipal Employees
Trade unions established in 1944
Trade unions in New York (state)